Nani Wolfgramm was a Tongan born Steel guitarist and recording artist who released multiple albums throughout the 1970s and 1980s.

Biography
Wolfgramm was born 1 November 1939 in Neiafu, Vava’u, Tonga. His parents were Konrad Uhi Wolfgramm, and Alilia Funaki Toutai Fulivai.  He was of Tongan and German descent.

He was the nephew of pioneering Steel Guitarist Bill Wolfgramm who along with Bill Sevesi made many recordings on the Viking Records label.

Nani had albums released on Viking, the same label as released his uncle Bill's albums. Nani's releases included The Sounds Of Hawaii, Hawaiian Cocktail  and Hawaii Calls 

He died on 26 August 2012 and is buried at Redwood Memorial Cemetery, Taylorsville, Salt Lake County, Utah.

Releases

Nani Wolfgramm and the South Pacific String

LP
 Hawaiian Cocktail - Viking SPVP 168

Nani Wolfgramm and the Islanders

LP's
 Hawaii Calls - Viking SPVP 152, 1976
 The Sounds of Hawaii - Viking SPVP 465

Compact Disc

 20 Golden Hits of Hawaii - Monitor Records MON61804
 Polynesian Girl - Monitor Records MON00826 - 1986

References

Tongan people of German descent
Viking Records artists
Steel guitarists
1939 births
2012 deaths